Phommathat was the fourth king of Lan Xang (Laos) (ruled 1428–1429). He was Lan Kham Deng's oldest son. He was king for only 10 months. He was assassinated by Nang Keo Phimpha. He was succeeded by Yukhon.

Family
Father: Lan Kham Deng - King of Lan Xang (r.1416-1428)
Mother: Queen Nang Kaeva Buma Fa (Keo Poum Fa)
Consorts and their Respective Issue:
 by unknown women
 Prince Kaya Bunabarna (Kay Bona Ban) - died in 1428 on the orders of his grandmother, Nang Keo Phimpha

References

Kings of Lan Xang
Year of birth unknown
1429 deaths
15th-century Laotian people
15th-century monarchs in Asia
Laotian Theravada Buddhists
Executed monarchs
Executed Laotian people
People executed by Laos by decapitation